Georgia Rae Leslie Sheehan (born 10 July 1999) is an Australian diver.

Sheehan competed in the women's 1 metre springboard event at the 2019 World Aquatics Championships.

She competed at the Commonwealth Games in 2018 where she won a gold medal in the women's synchronised 3 metre springboard event alongside Esther Qin and in 2022 where she came 5th in the women's 1 metre springboard event and 7th in the women's 3 metre springboard event.

Sheehan graduated from the Queensland University of Technology with a Bachelor of Creative Industries with distinction in 2023.

References

External links
 

1999 births
Living people
Australian female divers
Place of birth missing (living people)
Commonwealth Games medallists in diving
Commonwealth Games gold medallists for Australia
Divers at the 2014 Commonwealth Games
Divers at the 2018 Commonwealth Games
Divers at the 2022 Commonwealth Games
20th-century Australian women
21st-century Australian women
Medallists at the 2018 Commonwealth Games